Hollywood North is a 2003 Canadian film starring Matthew Modine and Jennifer Tilly.  It is a mockumentary detailing the struggles of two Canadian movie producers in Toronto circa 1979. The title is a reference to the colloquialism "Hollywood North".

Reception

Critical reception
Rotten Tomatoes reported that 44% of 9 sampled critics gave the film positive reviews and that it received a rating average of 5.41/10.

References

External links

 

2003 films
English-language Canadian films
Films set in Toronto
Films set in the 1970s
Canadian mockumentary films
2003 comedy films
2000s English-language films
2000s Canadian films